William Bond (fl. 1772 – 1827) was a British engraver.

Biography
Bond studied stipple engraving under Francesco Bartolozzi, with his first work being published in 1772. He was considered one of the best stipple engravers of the late 18th-century, along the likes of Richard Earlom, John Ogborne and Charles Turner. He was nominated to be the first president of the Society of Engravers in 1802/03.

Gallery

References

External links

Npg.org.uk

1772 births
1827 deaths
18th-century engravers
19th-century engravers
British engravers